Bertholdia soror is a moth of the family Erebidae. It was described by Harrison Gray Dyar Jr. in 1901. It is found in Venezuela and Brazil.

References

Phaegopterina
Moths described in 1901